Mineo is both an Italian surname and a masculine Japanese given name. Notable people with the name include:

Surname
Alfred Mineo (1880–1930), American Mafia Godfather, leader of the family that became the Gambino crime family
Settimo Mineo (born 1938), Italian mobster
Sal Mineo (1939–1976), American film and stage actor
Ted Mineo (born 1981), American artist
Andy Mineo (born 1988), American rapper

Given name
, Japanese politician and Commander of the Japanese Navy during World War II
, Japanese basketball player

Fictional characters
Joseph Mineo, fictional character on the HBO drama Oz

Italian-language surnames
Japanese masculine given names